Lorraine Amanda Shaw (born 2 April 1968) is an English hammer thrower.

Athletics career
Shaw's personal best throw, and the previous British record, is 68.93 metres, achieved in June 2003 in Loughborough. She competed at four consecutive Commonwealth Games; starting in 1994 when she represented England in the hammer throw event, at the 1994 Commonwealth Games in Victoria, British Columbia, Canada. Four years later she represented England and won a silver medal, at the 1998 Commonwealth Games in Kuala Lumpur, Malaysia. This was followed by a gold medal at the 2002 Commonwealth Games in Manchester and a bronze medal at the 2006 Commonwealth Games.

International competitions

References

Profile at Sporting Heroes

1968 births
Living people
Sportspeople from Gloucester
British female hammer throwers
English female hammer throwers
Olympic athletes of Great Britain
Athletes (track and field) at the 2000 Summer Olympics
Athletes (track and field) at the 2004 Summer Olympics
Commonwealth Games gold medallists for England
Commonwealth Games silver medallists for England
Commonwealth Games medallists in athletics
Athletes (track and field) at the 1994 Commonwealth Games
Athletes (track and field) at the 1998 Commonwealth Games
Athletes (track and field) at the 2002 Commonwealth Games
Athletes (track and field) at the 2006 Commonwealth Games
World Athletics Championships athletes for Great Britain
Medallists at the 1998 Commonwealth Games
Medallists at the 2002 Commonwealth Games
Medallists at the 2006 Commonwealth Games